is a Japanese television jidaigeki or period drama that was broadcast in prime-time in 1973. It depicts toseinin (yakuza) in the Edo period.

Characters 
Tatsu - Takashi Yamaguchi  
Ginji - Shigeru Tsuyuguchi
Ochika - Yoko Machida
Oshino - Mariko Kaga

See also
Kogarashi Monjirō

References

1973 Japanese television series debuts
1970s drama television series
Jidaigeki television series